Kusum Kusum Prem is a Bangladeshi Bengali language film. It was released 2011. The film directed by Mushfiqur Rahman Gulzar who also wrote the story. The film produced by Impress Telefilm Limited. Film stars Moushumi, Ferdous and Riaz in lead roles along with ATM Shamsuzzaman, Prabir Mitra, Khaleda Akter Kalpana, Amol Bose and Nasima Khan.

Plot
Kusum Kusum Prem, portraying life of a destitute woman namely Kusum.

Cast
 Moushumi - Kusum
 Ferdous - Hashem
 Riaz - Badol
 ATM Shamsuzzaman - Guno Munsi
 Prabir Mitra - Kashem
 Kaleda Akter Kalpana - Badal's Mother
 Amol Bose - Gunin
 Nasima Khan - Kashem's Wife

Music
The film Kusum Kusum Prem songs composed and directed by Emon Shaha. 
The playback singers of the movie are Kanak Chapa, Andrew Kishore, Monir Khan, Polash and Selim Chowdhury.

"Bhalobasha Dao" - Subir Nandi, Samina Chowdhury
"Buker Majhe Pushechilam" - Monir Khan 
"Ei Prithibi" - Monir Khan 
"Tor Alta Ranga Paye" - Monir Khan, Kanak Chapa

Accolades
 National Film Awards (for the year 2011)
Ferdous Ahmed and Emon Saha has been judged as best actor for his outstanding performance in the film Kusum Kusum Prem.Won. Best actor: FerdousWon'''. Best composer Emon Saha

References

External links 
 

2011 films
Films scored by Emon Saha
Bengali-language Bangladeshi films
Bangladeshi drama films
2010s Bengali-language films
2011 drama films
Impress Telefilm films